Vester Skerninge is a town located on the island of Funen in south-central Denmark, in Svendborg Municipality.

The town was the seat of the Egebjerg Municipality prior to the municipal reform in 2007, when it merged into the Svendborg Municipality.

Notable people 
 Frederik Christian von Haven (1728 in Vester Skerninge – 1763 in Yemen) was a Danish philologist and theologian who took part in (and died on) the Danish expedition to Yemen, which began in 1761

References 

Cities and towns in the Region of Southern Denmark
Svendborg Municipality